Doman Singh Nagpure (born March 1, 1944 in Khairlanji, Madhya Pradesh) is an Indian politician and member of the Republican Party of India (Khobragade). He is a follower of B. R. Ambedkar. Nagpure was a member of the Madhya Pradesh Legislative Assembly from the Khairlanji constituency in Balaghat district. He was inducted into Digvijay Singh's Cabinet in 1993.

References 

People from Balaghat district
Republican Party of India (Khobragade) politicians
Republican Party of India politicians
Madhya Pradesh MLAs 1993–1998
1944 births
Living people